List of football games played by the Iraq national under-23 football team since 1995.

Results

1990s
1995

1996

1999

2000s
2002

2003

2004

2006

2007

2010s
2011

2012

2013

2014

2015

2016

2017

2018

2019

2020s
2020

2021

2022

References

 Iraq U23 Olympic Matches
 Iraq under 23

U23